The 2015 Tour de Langkawi was the 20th edition of the Tour de Langkawi road cycling stage race. It took place in Malaysia between 8 and 15 March 2015, consisting of eight road stages. The race was rated by the UCI as a 2.HC (hors category) race as part of the 2015 UCI Asia Tour.

Teams
22 teams were selected to take part in the race. Four of these were UCI WorldTeams, seven were UCI Professional Continental teams, ten are UCI Continental teams and a Malaysian national team.

Route
The race was scheduled to include eight stages. The key stage was originally intended to be the seventh stage with a climb to the Genting Highlands, but this was cancelled due to dangerous construction work taking place on the road. A different climb, Fraser's Hill, took its place, since this climb was easier, many teams who had planned their races around the original climb were unhappy.

Stages

Stage 1
8 March 2015 — Langkawi (Pantai Chenang) to Langkawi (Pantai Chenang),

Stage 2
9 March 2015 — Alor Setar to Sungai Petani,

Stage 3
10 March 2015 — Gerik to Tanah Merah,

Stage 4
11 March 2015 — Kota Bharu to Kuala Berang,

Stage 5
12 March 2015 — Kuala Terengganu to Kuantan,

Stage 6
13 March 2015 — Maran to Karak,

Stage 7
14 March 2015 — Shah Alam to Fraser's Hill,

Stage 8
15 March 2015 — Kuala Kubu Bharu to Kuala Lumpur,

Classification leadership table
In the 2015 Tour de Langkawi, four different jerseys were awarded. For the general classification, calculated by adding each cyclist's finishing times on each stage, and allowing time bonuses for the first three finishers at intermediate sprints and at the finish of mass-start stages, the leader received a yellow jersey. This classification was considered the most important of the 2015 Tour de Langkawi, and the winner of the classification was considered the winner of the race.

Additionally, there was a points classification, which awarded a blue jersey. In the points classification, cyclists received points for finishing in the top 15 in a mass-start stage. For winning a stage, a rider earned 15 points, with a point fewer per place down to a single point for 15th place. Points towards the classification could also be accrued at intermediate sprint points during each stage; these intermediate sprints also offered bonus seconds towards the general classification. There was also a mountains classification, the leadership of which was marked by a red jersey. In the mountains classification, points were won by reaching the top of a climb before other cyclists, with more points available for the higher-categorised climbs.

The fourth jersey represented the Asian rider classification, marked by a white jersey. This was decided in the same way as the general classification, but only riders from Asia were eligible to be ranked in the classification. There was also a classification for teams, in which the times of the best three cyclists in a team on each stage were added together; the leading team at the end of the race was the team with the lowest cumulative time, while there was also an Asian-only variant for the teams as well.

Final standings

General classification

Points classification

Mountains classification

Asian rider classification

Team classification

Asian team classification

Riders who failed to finish

References

External links
 
 2015 Tour de Langkawi at cyclingarchives.com

Tour de Langkawi
Tour de Langkawi
Tour de Langkawi